The Beginners' Guide to the King Crimson Collectors' Club is a 2000 album by the band King Crimson, compiled from King Crimson Collectors' Club albums - limited release live recordings of concert performances, studio sessions and radio sessions.

Track listing
"21st Century Schizoid Man" (Robert Fripp, Michael Giles, Greg Lake, Ian McDonald, Peter Sinfield) - 8:02
from the album Live in Central Park, NYC
"I Talk to the Wind" (McDonald, Sinfield) - 4:45
from the album Live at the Marquee
"Larks' Tongues in Aspic (Part I)" (Bill Bruford, David Cross, Fripp, Jamie Muir, John Wetton) - 5:59
from the album The Beat Club, Bremen
"Ladies of the Road" (Fripp, Sinfield) - 5:58
from the album Live at Jacksonville
"Sailor's Tale" (Fripp) - 5:18
from the album Live at Summit Studios
"Thela Hun Ginjeet" (Adrian Belew, Bruford, Fripp, Tony Levin) - 5:46
from the album Live at Moles Club, Bath
"Elephant Talk" (Belew, Bruford, Fripp, Levin) - 5:00
from the album Live at Cap D'Agde
"People" (Belew, Bruford, Fripp, Trey Gunn, Levin, Pat Mastelotto) - 6:01
from the album King Crimson On Broadway
"Funky Jam" (Belew, Bruford, Fripp, Gunn, Levin. Mastelotto) - 4:29
from the album The VROOOM Sessions
"Seizure" - 7:49
Performed by ProjeKct Four
from the ProjeKct Four album The Roar of ProjeKct Four: Live in San Francisco

Notes
Record Store Day release. 
Issued in a regular jewel case with dark grey tray.
There is no barcode on this release.

References

2000 compilation albums
2000 live albums
King Crimson compilation albums
King Crimson live albums
Discipline Global Mobile albums